First Methodist Episcopal Church and Parsonage may refer to:

First Methodist Episcopal Church and Parsonage (Williams, Arizona), listed on the National Register of Historic Places in Coconino County, Arizona
First Methodist Episcopal Church and Parsonage (Glendive, Montana), listed on the National Register of Historic Places in Dawson County, Montana

See also
First Methodist Episcopal Church (disambiguation)